Lepteucosma charassuncus is a species of moth of the family Tortricidae. It is found in India (Jammu and Kashmir).

The ground colour of the forewings is greyish cream, sprinkled and suffused with grey especially in the basal third. The submedian part and distal fourth are cream. The markings are dark brownish grey. The hindwings are brownish grey.

Etymology
The species name refers to the shape of the uncus and is derived from Greek charasso (meaning sharpen).

References

External links

Moths described in 2006
Moths of Asia
Eucosmini
Taxa named by Józef Razowski